Vught is a municipality and a town in the southern Netherlands, and lies just south of the industrial and administrative centre of 's-Hertogenbosch. Many commuters live in the municipality, and the town of Vught was once named "Best place to live" by the Dutch magazine Elsevier.

Population centres
Cromvoirt
Helvoirt
Vught

TopographyDutch topographic map of the municipality of Vught, 2021History

Early history
The first mention of Vught in the historical record dates to the eleventh century.  By the fourteenth century, the Teutonic Order had acquired the parish and set up a commandery (feudalism) across from the Saint Lambert Church.  In 1328, the residents of Vught were granted the right of municipality by the Duke of Brabant.

Eighty Years War
During the Eighty Years War Vught was the site of struggles between Catholic interests and the troops of William of Orange.  The Saint Lambert Church was made into a Reformed Protestant church in the year 1629, after the troops of Frederick Henry, Prince of Orange, were victorious in 's-Hertogenbosch.

World War II

Vught is known for having been the site of a transit/concentration camp (Herzogenbusch) built by Nazi Germany during its occupation of the Netherlands in World War II. It was part of Camp Herzogenbusch, but usually better known as "Kamp Vught" (Camp Vught).  The camp held male and female prisoners, many of them Jewish and political activists, captured in Belgium and the Netherlands.  The guard staff included SS men and a few SS women, headed by Oberaufseherin Margarete Gallinat. The  SS initially used this location as a transit camp to gather mostly Jewish prisoners for classification and transportation to camps in Poland and other areas.

A group of women were severely punished for standing up for another female prisoner. Seventy-four women were pushed into a cell room of barely nine square meters and held there for over fourteen hours. Ten of the women died, and several suffered permanent physical or mental damage. The camp commander responsible was demoted by Himmler to the regular rank of soldier and sent to the Hungarian front; he died there in 1945.

Dutch underground members Corrie and Betsie ten Boom were held at Vught in 1944, before being sent to Ravensbrück concentration camp.  Vught was also a transition camp for many of the female laborers at the Agfa Kamerawerke in München-Giesing, where they built ignition and camera devices. Poncke Princen, who would later become known for going over to the Indonesian guerrillas opposing Dutch rule, was imprisoned at Vught for his anti-Nazi activities.

Vught was liberated by the Canadians at the end of the war, but only after German guards killed several hundred prisoners held there, mainly by firing squad.

Camp in post-war times

After World War II, the camp was first used as a prison for Germans and collaborators. Some of the camp has been preserved as a national monument related to the Nazi occupation during World War II. (See photo.)

The barracks of Camp Vught were later adapted into a number of home units to house Indonesian Moluccan exiles, former soldiers of the Netherlands armed forces and their families who were transferred to the Netherlands after Indonesian independence.

In addition, a prison called Nieuw Vosseveld was built on part of the site of Camp Vught. In the beginning, it chiefly held young offenders.  Today it is used for high-risk criminals. To this end, the prison was equipped with a high security unit, or EBI, in 1993.

Politics
On 2 April 2007 Roderick van de Mortel (VVD) was appointed mayor of Vught. The current aldermen are Mark du Maine (VVD), Yvonne Vos (CDA) and Toine van de Ven (PvdA-GroenLinks).

Landmarks and nature

Just outside the town border lies the lake IJzeren Man (literally translated Iron Man). It was named after the machine that dug it in the years 1890 to 1915. The sand was needed as fill for the expansion of the nearby city of 's-Hertogenbosch. The lake is about 2 kilometers long, has a small island and is now mainly used for recreation.

Maurick Castle dates back to the 13th century. In 1629 the castle was occupied by Frederick Henry, Prince of Orange. Frederick Henry wanted to have the castle as his headquarters for his siege of 's-Hertogenbosch.  The castle has been adapted to house a restaurant.

Vught is home to the Bredero barracks, which houses the Ministry of Defence's CBRN defense training center.

After the village of Helvoirt and surroundings had been transferred from the former municipality of Haaren to Vught in 2021, the eastern part of national park the Loonse en Drunense Duinen is part of the municipality.

Ewald Marggraff
Ewald Marggraff was a well-to-do nobleman who lived in Vught in the twentieth century. He became a hermit, but had studied law and acquired a large amount of land and several buildings.  He frequently argued with the local authorities, mostly over land issues. He chose to let all his properties deteriorate, which officials opposed, but letting his lands go enabled them to return to natural habitat. Animal species lived on his land that had disappeared elsewhere. His land holdings in and around the town of Vught were never open to the general public. On 7 December 2003 Marggraff's manor (Zionsburg) burned down; his body was found later in the entrance hallway near the front door.

Marggraff's surviving sisters founded a non-profit corporation, Marggraff stichting, to take over and manage their late brother's extensive landholdings for public use. The organisation has opened up the land for public access, allowing people from around the region to hike in the forests.

The non-profit also has plans to rebuild Marggraff's manor. In cooperation with SIX Architects BNA from Zeist, The Netherlands, it developed design and use plans, which are now under consideration by the local authorities.

Department of corrections — PI Vught

From 1953, part of the former detention camp was developed as a juvenile prison. Today it contains 15 separate units, holding 2400 prisoners. PI Vught has a prison with the status of a high-security unit. Amongst the criminals imprisoned there are:
 Samir Azzouz, terrorist with ties to Hofstad Network. Released in 2013.
 Mohammed Bouyeri, murderer of Theo van Gogh (film director). Serving a life sentence without parole.
 Willem Holleeder, one of the perpetrators in the kidnapping of Freddy Heineken. Life imprisonment.
 , nicknamed , drug dealer. Released in 2000.
 Curtis Warren, British drug trafficker. Released in 2007.
 Ridouan Taghi, drug trafficker and murderer.

Transport
Vught has a railway station with connections to Amsterdam/Utrecht via 's-Hertogenbosch, Maastricht via Eindhoven, Tilburg and Nijmegen. Highway 2 / E25 and Highway 65 / N93 intersect at Vught. As well as two Arriva buslines connecting Vught to the Jeroen Bosch Hospital, school district and central station, all located in neighbouring Den Bosch.

Notable residents

 Public thinking & Public Service 
 Isaac Jan Alexander Gogel (1765 in Vught – 1821) first Minister of finance of the Batavian Republic
 Betsie ten Boom (1885–1944) & Corrie ten Boom (1892–1983), sisters, Christian Holocaust survivors who housed Jewish families in their home and were held at Kamp Vught in WW11
 Frans Teulings (1891 – 1966 in Vught) a Dutch politician and Deputy Prime Minister 1951/1952
 Anton de Kom (1898–1945) Surinamese resistance fighter and anti-colonialist author
 Damiaen Joan van Doorninck (1902 in Vught - 1987) a naval officer and a POW in Colditz
 Ewald Marggraff (1923 in Vught – 2003) see narrative above'' 
 Edy Korthals Altes (born 1924 in Vught) economist, Dutch diplomat and peace advocate  
 Ad Geelhoed (1942 in Vught – 2007) a law professor, civil servant and Advocate-General of the European Court of Justice
 Jeroen Oerlemans (1970 in Vught – 2016) a Dutch photographer and war correspondent

The Arts 
 Erna Spoorenberg (1925 – 2004 in Vught) a Dutch soprano 
 Misha Geller (1937 – 2007 in Vught) a Russian viola player and composer
 Joost Prinsen (born 1942 in Vught) a Dutch actor, TV presenter, singer and writer 
 Mina Witteman (born 1959 in Vught) a Dutch children's author 
 Maarten van der Vleuten (born 1967 in Vught) a Dutch producer, composer and recording artist
 Jan-Hein Arens (born 1974 in Vught) a Dutch painter, sculptor and illustrator

Sport 

 Tonny van Lierop (1910 in Vught – 1982) a Dutch field hockey player and team bronze medallist in the 1936 Summer Olympics
 Harry Schulting (born 1956) a Dutch Olympian at the 400 meter hurdles and Dutch record holder, lives and works in Vught
 Pierre Hermans (born 1953 in Vught) a former field hockey goalkeeper, competed at the 1984 Summer Olympics
 Simon Tahamata (born 1956 in Vught) a former Dutch / Maluku Islands / Belgian footballer with 604 club caps 
 Bas de Bever (born 1968 in Vught) a Dutch former professional BMX racer 
 Martijn Bok (born 1973) a retired Dutch tennis player, lives in Vught
 Thomas Kortbeek (born 1979) a retired Dutch international athlete at the 400 meter hurdles, lives and works in Vught
 Vincent Kortbeek (born 1982 in Vught) as retired Dutch Olympian in bobsleigh
 Paul Beekmans (born 1982 in Vught) a football manager and former player with 280 club caps
 Koen van de Laak (born 1982 in Vught) a former professional footballer with 290 club caps
 Wouter van der Steen (born 1990 in Vught) a Dutch professional football goalkeeper with nearly 200 club caps
 Indy de Vroome (born 1996 in Cromvoirt) a Dutch tennis player
 Florian Rijkers (born 2005 in Vught) a dutch professional basketball player for heroes Den Bosch

See also
Joop Westerweel, resistance fighter during World War II
Heikant, Vught

Gallery

References

External links

 
 Kamp Vught
 Vughts Historisch Museum

 
Municipalities of North Brabant
Populated places in North Brabant
Holocaust locations in the Netherlands